Granville is a rural locality in the Fraser Coast Region, Queensland, Australia. It is a suburb of Maryborough. In the  Granville had a population of 2,716 people.

Geography 
The Mary River forms the north-western boundary and most of the south-western.

History 
Maryborough East State School opened on 25 May 1875. In 1938 it renamed Granville State School.

Granville Baptist Church opened in 1922. The official opening was on Saturday 18 March 1922. It was in Cambridge Street. It was demolished in 1972 and the timber used for extensions to the Baptist Church in Fort Street, Maryborough.

Education 
Granville State School is a government primary (Prep-6) school for boys and girls at Cambridge Street. In 2018, the school had an enrolment of 277 students with 28 teachers (24 full-time equivalent) and 21 non-teaching staff (16 full-time equivalent). It includes a special education program.

References

External links 
 

Fraser Coast Region
Localities in Queensland